Scotogramma fervida is a species of cutworm or dart moth in the family Noctuidae first described by William Barnes and Foster Hendrickson Benjamin in 1912. It is found in North America.

The MONA or Hodges number for Scotogramma fervida is 10239.

Subspecies
These two subspecies belong to the species Scotogramma fervida:
 Scotogramma fervida fervida g
 Scotogramma fervida proxima Barnes & Benjamin, 1924 c g
Data sources: i = ITIS, c = Catalogue of Life, g = GBIF, b = BugGuide

References

Further reading

 
 
 

Hadenini
Articles created by Qbugbot
Moths described in 1912